The ATP Auckland Open, commonly known by its sponsored name ASB Classic, is a professional men's tennis tournament in Auckland, New Zealand. The tournament is played annually at the ASB Tennis Centre, in Parnell. It is part of the ATP World Tour 250 series of the Association of Tennis Professionals (ATP) World Tour. The tournament is held annually in January a week before the first Grand Slam tournament of the season, the Australian Open.

The Auckland Open is expected to return in 2023 after the 2021 and 2022 events were cancelled due to the COVID-19 pandemic owing travel restrictions for international visitors to New Zealand.

History
In 1920 when the Auckland Lawn Tennis Association (now Tennis Auckland) was looking for a permanent base, the only available site was a tip in Stanley Street. Undeterred, the local clubs raised the-then enormous sum of 1,800 pounds to prepare the site and build new courts. For the next 30 years the Tennis Centre in Stanley Street was home to local tennis matches. In 1956 Auckland hosted its first permanent international tournament, the 'Auckland Championship'. The tournament was a joint men's and women's event until 1981.

From 1969, the first edition in the open era of tennis, until 1995 the tournament was known under its sponsored name 'Benson and Hedges Open'. From 1998 until 2015 it was named the 'Heineken Open'.

By the 1960s the shuttle bus fare from town to Stanley Street was sixpence. Admission was five shillings for the first three days and 7/6 for finals and semifinals – a whole tournament for the equivalent of $4. By the 1970s, 25 cents got you all-day parking next door at Carlaw Park. The tournament was played on outdoor grass courts from its inaugural edition in 1956 until 1977, switching to hard courts in 1978. Between 1979 and 1989 it was a tournament of the Grand Prix tennis circuit.

After being separated for 34 years, the WTA and ATP merged the event in 2016 and both tournaments are now known collectively as the ASB Classic. Heineken will still be a sponsor but will have a diminished role in anticipation of new tennis regulations restricting alcohol sponsorship.

Both the 2021 and 2022 Auckland Open were cancelled due to the COVID-19 pandemic. In regards to the 2022 cancellation, organizers cited New Zealand's strict quarantine rules as making it intractable for players, officials, and all other required staff to be admitted into the country.

Past finals

Men's singles

Men's doubles

See also
 List of tennis tournaments
 WTA Auckland Open – women's tournament
 BP National Championships – men's tournament

Notes

References

External links

 
 

 
Grand Prix tennis circuit
Hard court tennis tournaments
Recurring sporting events established in 1956
Tennis tournaments in New Zealand
ATP Tour 250
Sports competitions in Auckland
Summer events in New Zealand